The Dharohar Museum is located on the Kurukshetra University campus, Kurukshetra, Haryana, India.

History
The Dharohar Museum was set up in Kurukshetra University's golden jubilee year to exhibit archeological, cultural and architectural history and heritage of Haryana.

Sections and Exhibits
The museum has 23 sections and galleries showcasing different aspects of Harynavi culture:
 
 The Kurukshetra University: A Glimpse of History
 War-Heroes
 Freedom Fighters
 Architectural Heritage of Haryana
 Archaeological Heritage of Haryana
 Folk Musical Instruments of Haryana
 Wall Paintings
 Manuscripts
 Gher (Cattle Shed)
 Agriculture & Folk Festivals
 Water Heritage of Haryana
 Hukka
 Chaarpais (Cots)
 Domestic Articles of Haryana
 Art and Craft of Haryana
 Transportations of Haryana
 Professional artifacts/tools of Haryana
 Haryanvi Ornaments
 Haryanavi Rasois
 Folk Costumes of Haryana
 Theatre Chamber
 Library and Research
 Raj Kishan Nain Photo Gallery

Open-air Theatre
There is open-air theatre for Haryanavi folk art, music and dance performances.

Gallery

External links
 Video documentary on Dharohar museum

See also

 Haryana State Museum at Panchkula
 Haryana Rural Antique Museum at HAU Hisar
 Jahaj Kothi Museum at Hisar fort
 Rakhigarhi Indus Valley Civilisation Museum near Hisar
 Sheikhpura Kothi near Hansi
 Kurukshetra Panorama and Science Centre at Kurukshetra
 Shrikrishna Museum at Kurukshetra
 Sheikh Chilli's Tomb at Kurukshetra 
 Rewari Railway Heritage Museum at Rewari railway station

References

Kurukshetra
Tourist attractions in Kurukshetra district
Museums in Kurukshetra